Amanmyrat Hallyyev is a lawyer and former Prosecutor General of Turkmenistan.

Career 
In July 2006, Hallyyev was appointed state prosecutor for Mary Province; earlier, he was a prosecutor for the Bereket District of Balkan Province.

On 31 August 2013, Hallyyev was appointed Prosecutor General by President Berdimuhamedow; he replaced Yaranmurad Yazmuradov, who was removed from office on grounds of inefficiency and facilitation of illicit drugs trade. After a tenure of about three years, on 4 May 2017, Hallyyev was removed for failing to prevent bribery in prosecutorial services, and Batyr Atdayev was appointed to succeed him. 

As of February 2017, Hallyyev was referred to in the Turkmen official press as holding the rank of state counselor of justice, third class.   

On 12 May 2017, Hallyyev was detained along with other employees.

References 

Prosecutors general of Turkmenistan
Turkmenistan lawyers
Year of birth missing (living people)
Living people